Erieopterus is a genus of prehistoric eurypterid found in Silurian to Devonian-aged marine strata of Europe and North America. The genus contains eight species from the Silurian to the Devonian, recovered from both North America and Europe.

Species
Erieopterus eriensis  (Whitfield, 1882) — Silurian, USA
Erieopterus hypsophthalmus Kjellesvig-Waering, 1958 — Silurian, USA
?Erieopterus laticeps (Schmidt, 1883) — Silurian, Norway
?Erieopterus limuloides (Kjellesvig-Waering, 1948) — Silurian, USA
Erieopterus microphthalmus  (Hall, 1859) — Devonian, USA & Canada
?Erieopterus phillipsensis Copeland, 1971 — Silurian. Canada
?Erieopterus turgidus Stumm & Kjellesvig-Waering, 1962 — Silurian, USA

References

Eurypteroidea
Silurian eurypterids
Silurian arthropods of North America
Devonian arthropods of North America
Devonian eurypterids
Silurian first appearances
Devonian extinctions
Paleozoic life of Nunavut
Eurypterids of Europe
Eurypterids of North America
Bertie Formation